John Davies (born 25 September 1966) is a Scottish former footballer who played as a midfielder for Clydebank, Jönköping, St Johnstone, Airdrieonians, Ayr United and Motherwell. He won the Scottish Challenge Cup with Airdrie in 1994–95 and was a member of the squad when they reached the final of the Scottish Cup the same season, though took no part on the day.

Davies is the brother of Billy Davies and the brother-in-law of John Spencer, both former professional players and managers. Billy Davies signed both his brother and Spencer when boss of Motherwell in 1999.

He is also a FIFA qualified sports agent since 2006.

Honours
Airdrieonians
Scottish Challenge Cup: 1994–95

References

External links

1966 births
Living people
Footballers from Glasgow
Association football midfielders
Scottish footballers
Clydebank F.C. (1965) players
St Johnstone F.C. players
Airdrieonians F.C. (1878) players
Ayr United F.C. players
Motherwell F.C. players
Jönköpings Södra IF players
Scottish Football League players
Scottish Premier League players
Association football agents
Scottish expatriate sportspeople in Sweden
Expatriate footballers in Sweden
Scottish expatriate footballers
Association football coaches
Scottish expatriates in the United States
Derby County F.C. non-playing staff